"It's a Good Life" is the 8th episode of the third season of the American television series The Twilight Zone, and the 73rd overall. It was written by series creator/showrunner Rod Serling, based on the 1953 short story "It's a Good Life" by Jerome Bixby. The episode was directed by James Sheldon, and is considered by some, such as Time and TV Guide, to be one of the best episodes of the series. It originally aired on November 3, 1961. The episode was one of four from the original 1959 series which formed the basis of the 1983 film Twilight Zone: The Movie.

Opening narration

Plot summary
Six-year-old Anthony Fremont has godlike mental powers, including mind-reading. He has isolated his town of Peaksville, Ohio, from the rest of the universe. The people must grow their own food, and supplies of common household items, such as bar soap, have been dwindling. He has blocked television signals and caused cars not to work. He creates grotesque creatures, such as three-headed gophers, which he then kills. Everybody is under his rule, even his parents.

The people live in fear of Anthony, constantly telling him how everything he does is "good", since he banishes anyone thinking unhappy thoughts into the otherworldly cornfield from which there is no return. Never having experienced any form of discipline, Anthony does not seem to understand that his actions are wrong, and is confused when his father tells him that the neighbors are reluctant to let their children play with him after he sent several of his playmates to the cornfield.

One night each week, Anthony gives the townsfolk one hour of television, which he creates and projects onto the family TV set. The adults gather around in the Fremonts' living room, squirming uncomfortably as Anthony shows them a vision of battling dinosaurs with ample gore. Unable to voice their real feelings, they tell Anthony that it was far better than what used to be on TV.

Afterwards, the adults celebrate Dan Hollis' birthday. He gets two presents from his wife: a bottle of brandy (one of only five bottles of liquor left in the village) and a Perry Como record. Dan is eager to listen to the record, but he's reminded by everyone that Anthony does not like singing. Getting drunk from the brandy, he starts complaining about the miserable state of the town, not being able to listen to the record, and no one singing "Happy Birthday" to him. Dan snaps and confronts the child, calling him a monster and a murderer. While Anthony's anger grows, Dan yells for someone to attack Anthony from behind and end his reign of terror. Aunt Amy (who isn't able to sing anymore because of Anthony) tentatively reaches for a fireplace poker, but no one has the courage to act. Anthony transforms Dan into a jack-in-the-box, causing his wife to break down. The adults are horrified at what Anthony has done, and his father asks him to wish Dan into the cornfield, which Anthony does.

He then causes snow to begin falling outside. The snow will kill off at least half the crops and the town will face starvation. Anthony's father starts to rebuke Anthony about this, but his wife and the other adults look on with worried smiles on their faces. The intimidated father then smiles and tells Anthony "...But it's good that you're making it snow, Anthony, it's real good. And tomorrow... tomorrow's gonna be a real good day!"

Closing narration

Cast
 John Larch as Mr. Fremont
 Cloris Leachman as Mrs. Fremont
 Don Keefer as Dan Hollis
 Billy Mumy as Anthony Fremont 
 Alice Frost as Aunt Amy
 Max Showalter (as Casey Adams) as Pat Riley
 Jeanne Bates as Ethel Hollis
  Lenore Kingston as Thelma Dunn
  Tom Hatcher as Bill Soames

Reception and legacy
Time named this the third-best Twilight Zone episode, behind "Time Enough at Last" and "The Monsters Are Due on Maple Street".

Rod Serling's introduction at the beginning of this episode was recycled and digitally edited for the preshow of the Disney Parks attraction The Twilight Zone Tower of Terror. In the preshow video, Serling stands in front of a service elevator door, rather than a map of the United States, and explains to guests the journey they are about to experience. The attraction, which first opened at Disney-MGM Studios in 1994, almost two decades after Serling's death, is an homage to the original series with an original story based on it. When conceiving the attraction, Disney Imagineers wanted to include Serling in the attraction and opted for a voice artist to play him; Mark Silverman was chosen by Serling's widow to provide his voice. A poster advertising "Anthony Fremont's Orchestra" is displayed next to the concierge desk in the lobby of the attraction, an ironic reference to Anthony's hate for music.

In 1997 TV Guide ranked the episode number 31 on its 100 Greatest Episodes of All Time list.

The opening narration of this episode is sampled in "Threatened" by Michael Jackson in his 2001 album, Invincible.

Remake
In a 1974 interview with Marvel Comics, Rod Serling said "I'm on my third draft of a feature film based on Jerome Bixby's short story, 'It's a Good Life'. We did it originally on Twilight Zone but now we're doing a full-length version. Alan Landsburg, who produced Chariots of the Gods, is producing it. It's in the fantasy-horror genre." This was one of Serling's last interviews before his death in 1975.

Twilight Zone: The Movies "It's a Good Life" segment is a remake of the original episode, and is directed by Joe Dante.

Pop culture
The 1980 song "Cemetery Girls" by novelty rock group Barnes & Barnes refers to the episode in its lyrics ("Fresh souls in the cornfield...Anthony put them there..."), and with samples of lines.  Since the album was released several years before fictional twin brothers Art (Bill Mumy) Barnes and Artie (Robert Haimer) went "public" about their identities, the reference is an in-joke.

This episode was also remade as a parody in The Simpsons episode "Treehouse of Horror II" in 1991.

The 1997 episode "Johnny Real Good" from Johnny Bravo is also based on this episode. Johnny has to babysit a boy named Timmy, who also has supernatural powers and sends Johnny several times to a nearby cornfield for "thinking bad thoughts."

The 2007 Pulitzer Prize-winning novel The Brief Wondrous Life of Oscar Wao uses the episode as an analogy for life under the dictator Rafael Trujillo in the Dominican Republic.

The online virtual world Second Life has a "region of mythological status where once naughty avatars were sent to think about what they had done" called "The Cornfield".

The 2017 Black Mirror episode "USS Callister" was conceived with the episode as an inspiration.

Sequel
In the 2002 revival series, a sequel to this episode was broadcast, titled "It's Still a Good Life". In the episode, Anthony is a middle-aged man who now has a daughter Audrey who has inherited his powers. Bill Mumy and Cloris Leachman reprised their roles from the original episode.  Anthony Fremont's daughter, Audrey, is played by actor Bill Mumy's real-life daughter Liliana Mumy.

A commercial for Me-TV airing on that channel in 2015 features an adult Bill Mumy as adult Anthony intercut with scenes from the original episode, apparently interacting as the adult Anthony uses his powers to beam Me-TV to little Anthony's set. In early 2017, the network used clips from this episode in promos for the show's late-night reruns.

References

Bibliography
 Zicree, Marc Scott: The Twilight Zone Companion. Sillman-James Press, 1982 (second edition)
 DeVoe, Bill. (2008). Trivia from The Twilight Zone. Albany, GA: Bear Manor Media. 
 Grams, Martin. (2008). The Twilight Zone: Unlocking the Door to a Television Classic. Churchville, MD: OTR Publishing. 
 Diaz, Junot. Penguin Books New York (2007) The Brief Wondrous Life of Oscar Wao p.g 224
 Wiater, Stan, et al. (2007). The Stephen King Universe: The Guide to the Worlds of the King of Horror (1st ed.). Los Angeles, CA: Renaissance Books. p. 427.

External links
 

1961 American television episodes
The Twilight Zone (1959 TV series season 3) episodes
Fictional telepaths
Television episodes written by Rod Serling
Television episodes based on short fiction
Television episodes set in Ohio